Nunamara is a rural locality in the local government area (LGA) of Launceston in the Launceston LGA region of Tasmania. The 2016 census has a population of 291 for the state suburb of Nunamara.

Nunamara has a truck stop style general store, a small village hall and a war memorial.

History 
Nunamara was gazetted as a locality in 1963.

Nunamara Post Office opened in 1913 and closed in 1927.

Former Tasmanian premier Peter Gutwein grew up in Nunamara.

Geography
The North Esk River forms a small part of the southern boundary, as does its tributary St Patricks River, which also forms two segments of the northern boundary before flowing through to the south.

Road infrastructure
Route A3 (Tasman Highway) passes through from west to north. Route C854 (Patersonia Road) starts at an intersection with A3 and runs north until it exits. Route C824 (Prossers Road) starts at an intersection with C854 and runs north-west until it exits. Route C829 (Pecks Hill Road) starts at an intersection with A3 and runs north-west until it exits. Route C404 (Mount Barrow Road) starts at an intersection with A3 and runs south-east to Mount Barrow, where it ends.

References 

Towns in Tasmania
Localities of City of Launceston